Kim Keon-hee (born 2 September 1972) is a South Korean businesswoman, who is the current First Lady of South Korea since 10 May 2022 as the wife of the 13th president of South Korea Yoon Suk-yeol. She is the current chief executive officer and president of the art exhibition company, Covana Contents.

Early life
Kim was born on 2 September 1972 in Yangpyeong, South Korea. She attended Myungil Girls' High School before graduating from Kyonggi University with an art degree.

Career
In 2009, Kim established Covana Contents, a company that specializes in art exhibitions and has been serving as the chief executive officer and president since then. In 2019, the media reported that she had allegedly not paid taxes. Kim has been investigated for allegedly taking kickbacks for hosting art exhibitions.

In 2021, there were reports that Kim had inflated her resume with connections to the New York University Stern School of Business. In a press conference, she later publicly apologized and promised only "to focus on role as Yoon's spouse even if Yoon is elected." Following her promise, Yoon included abolition of Office of the First Lady within the Office of the President in his campaign promise.

At the end of 2021, prosecutors announced that they will start investigations against Kim for corruption regarding a stock market manipulation.

Personal life
Kim married Yoon Suk-yeol in 2012. On 10 March 2022, upon her husband's election as president-elect of South Korea, Kim stated that she preferred the term president's spouse to first lady.

References

1972 births
Living people
21st-century businesswomen
21st-century South Korean businesspeople
First Ladies of South Korea
Kyonggi University alumni
Sookmyung Women's University alumni
Seoul National University alumni
Kookmin University alumni
People from Yangpyeong County
South Korean chief executives
South Korean women in business
Women chief executives
Yoon Suk-yeol